The Globe Gazette, known locally as the Globe, is a daily morning newspaper published in Mason City, Iowa in the United States.

History
The Globe Gazette traces its history back to July 17, 1858, and a weekly newspaper called The Cerro Gordo Press, named for Cerro Gordo County. By the time Lee Enterprises acquired the newspaper in 1925, under its current name, it had been known as the Republican, the Express, the Express-Republican, the Freeman, the Western Democrat, the Herald, the Times-Herald, the Gazette, and the Globe. The newspaper published in the afternoon, Monday through Saturday, until 1977, when the Saturday edition switched to morning publication. In 1981, all publication switched to a morning schedule. Sunday Globes began publication in 1985.

Content
Reporting focuses on local news across a nine-county coverage area  and high school sports in 16 school districts. Opinions and editorials published by the newspaper represent a major forum for debate on local issues. The Globe Gazette entered the Internet news arena much earlier than most small newspapers and continues to offer continuously updated content on its website, official Facebook (@mcglobegazette) and Twitter (@globegazette) pages, and its mobile app. The Globe publishes a printed newspaper and e-Edition  Tuesday through Sunday. A national-wire e-Edition is published online for subscribers on Mondays.

References

Cerro Gordo Press
Ref. to Mason City Globe Gazette in 1895

External links
 
 
 On Newspapers.com
 On Muck Rack

1858 establishments in Iowa
Daily newspapers published in the United States
Lee Enterprises publications
Mason City, Iowa
Newspapers published in Iowa
Publications established in 1858